Colliot is a French surname. Notable people with the surname include:

Émile Colliot (1824–1881), French playwright and poet
Jean-Louis Colliot-Thélène (born 1947), French mathematician
Roger Colliot (1925–2004), French football defender

French-language surnames